The Babylon Rail Road was a horsecar line in Babylon Village, New York, later converted to a trolley line. It was opened in 1871 and ceased operations in 1920.

The line's main purpose was to provide transportation between the Long Island Rail Road station at the north end of the village center, to ferries for Jones Beach and Fire Island destinations. In 1910 Babylon Railroad established a second line to Amityville Station. They also planned a connection to the South Shore Traction Company (later Suffolk Traction Company) in Sayville, New York that was never built. By 1918, the original line of the Babylon railroad ceased to operate, and the Babylon-Amityville Line was terminated two years later.

References

External links
 Babylon Rail Road and Fire Island

Defunct New York (state) railroads
Streetcar lines on Long Island
Defunct public transport operators in the United States
Railway companies established in 1871
Railway companies disestablished in 1920
1871 establishments in New York (state)
1920 disestablishments in New York (state)
American companies established in 1871
American companies disestablished in 1920